Anne-Lise Touya (born 19 January 1981) is a French fencer. She competed in the sabre events at the 2004 and 2008 Summer Olympics.

References

External links
 

1981 births
Living people
French female sabre fencers
Olympic fencers of France
Fencers at the 2004 Summer Olympics
Fencers at the 2008 Summer Olympics
Sportspeople from Tarbes
21st-century French women